Vora may refer to :

Places 
 Vörå, a municipality in Finland 
 Vorë or Vora, a town in Albania

People 
 Arun Vora, Indian politician
 Batuk Vora, Indian journalist
 Motilal Vora, Indian politician
 Neeraj Vora, Indian film director
 Joyce Demmin, Indian cricketer
 Ramanlal Vora, Indian politician
 Virji Vora, Indian merchant

Other uses